Mad Jack may refer to:

People

 John Byron (British Army officer) (1756–1791), English captain, father of Lord Byron
 Jack Churchill (1906–1996), British World War II lieutenant colonel who fought armed with a longbow, arrows, and a Scottish broadsword sword, and carried around bagpipes
 Mad Jack Fuller (1757–1834), English politician, noted for building a number of follies in Sussex
 Mad Jack Hall (1672–1716), Jacobite leader
 Charles Howard, 20th Earl of Suffolk (1906–1941), World War II bomb disposal expert
 John Mytton (1796–1834), English eccentric and rake
 John Percival (1779–1862), US Navy captain
 Siegfried Sassoon (1886–1967), English First World War poet, writer and soldier

Fictional characters
 two of the various Jack O'Lantern (Marvel Comics) villains
 the title character of Mad Jack the Pirate, a 1990s cartoon

Lists of people by nickname